Eupithecia amplexata is a moth in the  family Geometridae. It is found in China, Russia and Japan.

The wingspan is about 17–20 mm.

Subspecies
Eupithecia amplexata amplexata
Eupithecia amplexata pryeriaria Leech, 1897

References

Moths described in 1881
amplexata
Moths of Asia